WFXA-FM (103.1 MHz) is a Mainstream Urban radio station in Augusta, Georgia known as Foxie 103 Jamz. The station is licensed by the Federal Communications Commission (FCC) to broadcast with an effective radiated power (ERP) of 6,000 watts.  The station is owned by Perry Broadcasting.  The station's studios (which are shared with its other sister stations) and transmitter are co-located at the aptly named intersection of Broadcast Drive and Radio Station Road in North Augusta, South Carolina.

History
The station signed on in 1968 as WZZW with an automated beautiful music format. It was one of the first stations in the Augusta market to broadcast in full stereo. The station flipped to urban on February 1, 1985 as WFXA.  In 2001, the station was purchased by Radio One.

WFXA was formerly home to the syndicated Doug Banks Morning Show and was the only Radio One station to carry the show. When former owner Radio One sold their Augusta cluster to Oklahoma City-based Perry Broadcasting in August 2007, Doug Banks was dropped for  The Rickey Smiley Morning Show.

On January 11, 2008 at 2:58 pm WFXA relaunched itself, changing its branding from Foxie 103.1 Jamz, "The People's Station" to 103 Jamz The Fox, The Hip-Hop & R&B Leader".

Around the end of 2009, WFXA once again started identifying as Foxie 103 Jamz.  Its direct competition is WPRW and WIIZ. In January 2020, when The Rickey Smiley Morning Show was sent to sister station WAKB when The Tom Joyner Morning Show went off the air for good, It was replaced by the new syndicated urban morning show The Morning Hustle.

See also

Media in Augusta, Georgia

External links
Foxie 103 Jamz official website

Mainstream urban radio stations in the United States
FXA
Radio stations established in 1985
1985 establishments in Georgia (U.S. state)